Derakht-e Bid (also Romanized as Derakht-e Bīd) is a village in Pain Velayat Rural District, Razaviyeh District, Mashhad County, Razavi Khorasan Province, Iran. At the 2006 census, its population was 176, in 39 families.

References 

Populated places in Mashhad County